Regele Ferdinand (F221) is a Type 22 frigate of the Romanian Naval Forces, formerly a Royal Navy ship named HMS Coventry (F98). She was originally intended to be named Boadicea but was named Coventry in honour of the previous Coventry, a Type 42 destroyer sunk in the Falklands War.  Following service in the Royal Navy she was sold to the Romanian Navy in 2003.

Operational Service
Royal Navy
Between 1990 and 1996 Coventry was the leader of the 1st Frigate Squadron. The ship received the freedom of the city of Coventry in 1988.

Romanian Navy

She was purchased from the United Kingdom by the Romanian Navy on 14 January 2003, and renamed Regele Ferdinand (King Ferdinand) after Ferdinand I of Romania. The ship was handed over to Romania on 19 August 2004, and underwent sea trials at the same time.  Regele Ferdinand was commissioned into the Romanian Navy on 9 September 2004 with the pennant number F221, and is the current flagship of the Romanian Navy. There has since been some controversy over the price at which she was bought.

On 22 March 2011, President of Romania Traian Băsescu said, after a CSAT meeting, that Romania will send the frigate Regele Ferdinand with 205 mariners and two officers on board to enforce an arms embargo in the Mediterranean Sea, as part of the 2011 military intervention in Libya - Operation Unified Protector.

Since entry into service of the Romanian Navy, Regele Ferdinand has performed a series of tasks among which the most important are deployments to Operation Active Endeavour in 2005, 2007, 2008, 2010 in the Mediterranean Sea, the exercise in Bulgaria "Breeze -CertExam"  2007, 2008, the exercise "Noble Midas" in Croatia in 2007 and 2008 in Italy.

Since 13 September 2012 Regele Ferdinand has participated in Operation Atalanta. The ship embarked naval commandos of Grupul Naval de Forțe pentru Operații Speciale (GNFOS).

In August 2014, Regele Ferdinand sailed alongside Standing NATO Maritime Group 2 Task Unit 2 which operated in the Black Sea as part of Exercise Sea Breeze.

In July 2019, the Romanian authorities announced the selection of Naval Group and its partner Santierul Naval Constanta (SNC) for the programme to build four new Gowind multi-mission corvettes and to modernise the T22 frigates.

Commanding officers

Gallery

See also
Regele Ferdinand class, a World War II-era namesake
NMS Regele Ferdinand (Regele Ferdinand class destroyer)

References

External links

 

Ships built by Swan Hunter
Ships built on the River Tyne
1986 ships
Type 22 frigates of the Royal Navy
Type 22 frigates of the Romanian Naval Forces